James McConica may refer to:

 James Kelsey McConica (born 1930), Canadian priest and academic
 Jim McConica (born 1950), American swimmer